Independent Cinema may refer to:

 Independent movie theater
 Non-chain movie theaters such as those listed at Independent cinema in the United Kingdom
 Independent film